Joe Ghartey (born 15 June 1961, in Accra) is a Ghanaian lawyer, academic and politician. He is a former Attorney-General of Ghana (2006–2009), Second Deputy Speaker of Parliament (2013–2017) and Railways and Development Minister (2017–2021). Joe Ghartey hails from Shama, in the Western Region of the Republic of Ghana.

Early life and education 
Joe Ghartey was born in Accra, Ghana, to a teacher, Lauraine Ghartey (née Daniels), and a public servant, Joseph Ghartey, on 15 June 1961. He started his early education at the Ridge Church School in Accra and later moved to the secondary boarding school, Mfantsipim School, in Cape Coast. It was during his time at Mfantsipim School that his leadership qualities began to show. He was appointed House Prefect of Pickard-Parker House in his senior year and he used his good offices to champion the development of sports and student participation in sports programmes at Mfantsipim. He would go on to become Team Manager for the sports teams in the school.

After Mfantsipim, Ghartey enrolled to study law and obtained his LLB (Hons) degree in 1986 from the University of Ghana, and BL from the Ghana School of Law in 1988, he was called to the Bar of Ghana in that same year.

Legal career and academia 

Ghartey undertook his National Service duty as Legal Officer to the Komenda Eguafo Abirem District Assembly in the Central Region of the Republic of Ghana. He also took up a job as an Associate at the Chambers of Lawyer Gwira in Sekondi. Later, he would join the firm of Akufo-Addo, Prempeh & Co., a leading law firms in Ghana, which was co-founded by his future colleague parliamentarian and Cabinet Minister in the John Kufuor administration, Nana Akufo-Addo. Ghartey left this firm after seven years and in 1994 co-founded the law firm, Ghartey & Ghartey with his wife Efua Ghartey, who is a respected lawyer in her own right. He is currently the Senior Partner at Ghartey & Ghartey, a well respected firm of barristers & Sand solicitors located at Labone in Accra.

Throughout his legal career, Ghartey has invested heavily in providing legal services to businesses that are keen on creating jobs for a stronger Ghanaian economy. In his own words, "A strong economy hinges on strong businesses. Strong businesses must of necessity have strong legal foundations". He has provided legal services to several corporate entities and professional bodies, both nationally and internationally, ranging from the field of Taxation through to Labour law, Environmental and Company law. He is an authority in Corporate and Investment law.

He has additionally supported many Human Rights causes in Ghana. As a co-founder of the Ghana Committee on Human and Peoples Rights, Hon. Ghartey has provided extensive education on Human Rights, Civil Rights and Obligations to various citizen groups. The committee was consequently given observer status at the African Commission on Human and Peoples’ Rights. He also served as Chair of the Inter African Network of Human Rights Organizations based in Zambia.

As a speaker and a teacher, Ghartey has also lectured in various fields of Law and Investment. He was an adjunct lecturer of Investment Law at the University of Ghana Business School. He has also served as lecturer in Corporate Governance and Executive MBA at the Ghana Institute of Management and Public Administration (GIMPA). He was also for a period an instructor at the Ghana Stock Exchange. In 2004, he authored what has become Ghana's leading legal publication on Investment and Business, "Doing Business and Investing in Ghana – Legal and Institutional Framework". He also taught Company Law at the Ghana School of Law and Mountcrest University in Accra.

Political career and governance 
Ghartey is a member of the New Patriotic Party (NPP). He was inspired to join the Party in 1992 because it espouses strong values that he shares personally — Freedom, Democracy, Respect for Human Rights and the Rule of Law, as well as Private Sector Development, a philosophy that is very dear to his heart. He started off as a member of the Sekondi Campaign Team and later served as Chairman of the Greater Accra Regional Disciplinary Committee of the Party. He was part of the team that wrote the "Stolen Verdict", in 1993, which was a detailed account of the widespread electoral malpractices that occurred during the 1992 general election. He chaired the Session of the National Conference which amended the constitution of the NPP at the Trade Fair Center in Accra on 22 August 2009. This was when the Electoral College for the election of the presidential candidate was expanded from a few thousand delegates to more than one hundred thousand delegates. He was also a member of the team of legal experts appointed by the National Council of the NPP to review the conduct of the election petition that was filed in the Supreme Court after the 2012 general elections and to provide recommendations going forward. The Committee submitted its report to the National Council. The report included proposals for reform of the electoral process in Ghana.

All along the coastal belt of Ghana, Ghartey has supported many constituencies in the Western, Central, Greater Accra and Volta Regions, including Shama, Sekondi, Takoradi, Effie Kwasimintsim, Tarkwa, Prestea, Amenfi, Korle Klottey, La-Dade Kotopon and Hohoe. In 2000, he was a pillar in the Western Regional Presidential Campaign Team of the NPP, travelling the length and breadth of the region with the then candidate John Kufuor, who went on to win the general elections in December that year.

Ghartey is currently the NPP Member of Parliament for Essikado/Ketan Constituency in the Western Region of the Republic of Ghana. He was first elected to the seat in the December 2004 elections and was re-elected in both the December 2008 and December 2012 elections. In all the three elections he was not contested in the primaries of the NPP to choose the parliamentary candidate for the Constituency.

During the administration of President John Agyekum Kufuor, Ghartey was appointed Deputy Attorney General and Deputy Minister of Justice in March 2005. He was soon promoted and appointed the substantive Attorney-General and Minister of Justice in June 2006, a position he held until January 2009 following the electoral loss of the NPP in the 2008 general elections. Ghartey was the longest serving Attorney-General and Minister of Justice under the Kufuor administration. He was also assigned a role as a consultant to the Parliament of Sierra Leone and drafted a code of conduct for that Parliament.In May, 2017.

Attorney-General and Minister of Justice 

In June 2006, a Ministerial reshuffle by President Kufuor saw Ghartey being elevated from the position of Deputy Attorney-General and Minister of Justice to the Attorney-General and Minister of Justice. He was subsequently sworn into office by President Kufuor on 16 June 2006 as the 20th Attorney-General and Minister of Justice of the Republic of Ghana. He was another laudable addition to a long line of such distinguished former Ghanaian Attorneys-General as Victor Owusu (1966–69), and Nana Akufo-Addo (2001–03).

As Attorney-General, Ghartey launched an Agenda for Change in the Ministry of Justice. The main aim was to radically improve the effectiveness of the office and impact significantly on all aspects of justice delivery in Ghana. Its flagship programme was Justice for All which, among other things, aimed at providing access to the courts for people who had been in remand custody for long periods without prosecution. This programme saw the release of hundreds of incarcerated persons from custody who had not been prosecuted or convicted but were being held by the State.

As Attorney-General, he led his legal teams to court on several high-profile cases. His special interest in Investment Law was evident in the development of the legal framework and infrastructure for the Oil and Gas Industry in Ghana. As a member of the Mines and Energy Committee of Parliament, he was instrumental in the decision to establish of the Petroleum Commission of Ghana. As a Cabinet Minister, he represented the President at several international fora on legal and investment matters.

Deputy Speakership 

After the 2012 general elections, Hon. Ghartey was nominated by the NPP minority in parliament to the position of Second Deputy Speaker of Parliament in the 6th Parliament of the 4th Republic. The position of the 2nd Deputy Speaker of Parliament by precedent goes to a minority Party in Parliament. However, following the NPP's challenge of the validity of the election of John Dramani Mahama as president of Ghana and their subsequent boycott of his inauguration, some members of the majority NDC were of the view that, "the NPP should not be rewarded with the position since it had decided to boycott the inauguration of John Mahama of the NDC as President in the same election it is challenging." The NDC, citing precedent by the NPP, who in the past had chosen to vote for Malik Alhassan Yakubu (an NPP candidate) against the NDC's Ken Dzirasah, wanted to sponsor a PNC newcomer to the position instead. However, Joe Ghartey was eventually unanimously elected to the position by Members of Parliament on 7 January 2013.

Since assuming office, he has championed the formulation of rules to guard against conflict of interest among Ghana's legislators. Until his rise to the position of 2nd Deputy Speaker of Parliament, he was the Ranking member of the Constitutional and Legal Affairs Committee, member of the Government Assurances Committee and a member of the Mines and Energy Committee. He currently chairs the Committee of Members Holding Offices of Profit. As well, he is a member of the Constitutional, Legal and Parliamentary Committee and the Standing Orders Committee. He was also appointed a Consultant to the Parliament of Sierra Leone and drafted a Code of Conduct for that Parliament.

Cabinet Minister 
In May 2017, President Akufo-Addo created the Ministry of Railways Development as a cabinet position and  named Joe Ghartey as the sector Minister his cabinet.

Campaign for NPP Presidential candidate 
Hon. Joe Ghartey declared his intention to contest the position for presidential candidate of the New Patriotic Party before the 2016 general elections. He filed his nomination papers for the position on 7 July 2014, along with six other aspirants. There was a Special Delegates Congress on 31 August 2014 by the Party to trim the number of aspirants down to five, in accordance with the Constitution of the NPP. he was third but chose not to go for the second round but supported the winning candidate Nana Addo Dankwa Akuffo-Addo, the President.

Personal life 
Joe Ghartey is married to Efua Ghartey, a lawyer and co-founder of the law firm, Ghartey & Ghartey. Mrs. Efua Ghartey also serves as the Chairperson of the Bible Society of Ghana and the Chairperson of the International Board of the United Bible Societies (UBS), which operates in more than 200 countries. She is additionally the president of the Greater Accra Ghana Bar Association as well as a member of the Constitutional and Legal Committee of the New Patriotic Party. They have five children.

Sports and other activities 
From his days as team manager of Mfantsipim School sports teams, Ghartey has been a football fanatic and a strong supporter of Ghana's local football league. He has previously served as counsel to the Accra Hearts of Oak Supporters Union (National Chapters Committee) and subsequently became Chairman of Sekondi Eleven Wise, leading the club from the second to the first division of the football league.

Ghartey is also a philanthropist and supports many causes he personally believes in. He is an avid reader and an accomplished author and is currently working on various scholarly projects that will see print in due course.

References 

1961 births
Living people
Ghanaian MPs 2005–2009
Ghanaian MPs 2009–2013
Ghanaian MPs 2013–2017
20th-century Ghanaian lawyers
University of Ghana alumni
Mfantsipim School alumni
Academic staff of the University of Ghana
Attorneys General of Ghana
New Patriotic Party politicians
Government ministers of Ghana
Ghana School of Law alumni
Cabinet Ministers of Ghana
Ghanaian MPs 2017–2021
Ridge Church School alumni
Ghanaian MPs 2021–2025
Fante people
21st-century Ghanaian lawyers